Narayana Pandita may refer to:
 Narayana Panditacharya or Narayana Pandita (c. 1290 – c. 1370), author of Sri MadhwaVijaya
 Narayana Pandita (mathematician) (1325–1400), author of Ganita Kaumudi
 Narayan Pandit, author of the Hitopadesha in Sanskrit